Keren DeBerg is an American singer, and lyricist. She has performed at Lilith Fair and is known for contributing songs to the TV show Scrubs.

Early career
DeBerg left Miami, Florida after graduating high school and began defining her sound in the New York City nightclubs where she built a following. DeBerg was included in the third and final Lilith Fair, and sang with punk rock artist Jonathan Richman (There's Something About Mary) on his album I'm So Confused. DeBerg also wrote and was featured in an article for Seventeen magazine depicting the realities of being a woman in the male-dominated rock scene.

DeBerg relocated to Los Angeles and had her songs featured on TV shows. It was there she put new recordings together and started her own indie label, Big Pea & A Dime Music. Tracks from that record were featured on The WB's Everwood and Jack & Bobby, MTV's Laguna Beach and The Hills, NBC's Scrubs (in which she also appeared once, as a singing nurse).

DeBerg made her song "Gone" (from her album of the same name) available in millions of General Motors cars around the country when the song was digitally loaded into the dashboards of select GM cars as part of its digital mobile media package, powered by Phatnoise. She followed this with appearances at Borders Books locations and a tour of the West Coast of the United States.

DeBerg's sophomore album, the full-length Overwhelmed, was released on November 11, 2008.

DeBerg's song "Get Up & Go" was chosen by UEFA as the official song of the Under-21 Championship games that were held in Sweden in the summer of 2009. The song was played during every match leading up to finals, where she performed the song live at Eleda Stadion.

Personal life 
DeBerg is married to actor Jeffrey Muller.

Discography
 Mended (2016)
 Overwhelmed (2008)
 Gone (2004)

References

External links
 Official site.
 Official Blog
 Lilith Fair: Artists: Keren DeBerg
 ASCAP Audio Portrait: Keren DeBerg

American women singer-songwriters
Living people
Year of birth missing (living people)
21st-century American women